Robin Currie McBryde (born 3 July 1970), is a rugby union former player and coach. He gained 37 caps for Wales. He played hooker.

Background
McBryde was born in north Wales.

He is a fluent Welsh speaker.

McBryde worked as an overhead linesman before becoming a professional rugby player.

Rugby playing career
McBryde first played club rugby for Bangor RFC, Porthaethwy and for the North Wales team. He then moved to South Wales in search of a higher standard of rugby. He joined Swansea then moved to Llanelli, making his first appearance for the club on 1 October 1994 against Cardiff. He captained Llanelli when they won the Welsh Cup in 1998 and the Welsh Championship in 1999 and later played for the Llanelli Scarlets regional side when they were formed in 2003. He played 250 games for Llanelli and the Scarlets between 1994 and 2005.

He won his first cap for Wales against Fiji in 1994. His last international appearance was as a replacement in the match against Ireland in March 2005 which saw Wales clinch the Grand Slam.

He was selected for the 2001 British Lions tour to Australia, appearing against Western Australia, Queensland Presidents XV, Australia A and New South Wales, before he was unfortunately forced out of the tour by injury and replaced by Dorian West.

In August 2005 he announced his retirement from rugby following surgery to remove a disc from the top of his spine.

Rugby coaching career
After retiring from playing, McBryde was appointed coach of the Scarlets Regional Under 18 team.

He was subsequently appointed forwards coach for the Welsh national team. In June 2009 he was caretaker head coach of the Wales national team for the two match North American tour during Warren Gatland's absence as assistant coach to the British & Irish Lions. Wales won both matches against Canada and USA. He will again be caretaker head coach for interim head coach Rob Howley who is currently filling in for Warren Gatland. Both Gatland and Howley are coached in the 2013 British & Irish Lions tour to Australia.

It was announced that he would join Leinster rugby as an Assistant coach after the 2019 Rugby World Cup.

Other notable roles and work
McBryde won the "Wales' strongest man" competition in 1992.

In 2007, McBryde took over the role of Grand Sword Bearer at the National Eisteddfod of Wales, Wales’s ancient gathering of bards, from Ray Gravell.

References

External links
Wales profile

1970 births
Living people
Bards of the Gorsedd
British & Irish Lions rugby union players from Wales
Llanelli RFC players
People educated at Ysgol Tryfan
Rugby union hookers
Rugby union players from Bangor, Gwynedd
Swansea RFC players
Wales international rugby union players
Wales national rugby union team coaches
Welsh rugby union coaches
Welsh rugby union players